Save Zimbabwe is a broad coalition of organizations spearheaded by the Zimbabwe Christian Alliance (CA). Members include the Movement for Democratic Change and other opposition parties, church groups, civil rights groups and trade unions.

The campaign's stated aims are for the restoration of democracy, human rights and legitimate government to Zimbabwe through providing early, free and fair elections under proper international supervision. Its chief spokesman is Ephraim Tapa, former president of the Civil Service Employees Union in Zimbabwe.

Prayer Rally
On 11 March 2007 Zimbabwe police broke up a Save Zimbabwe prayer rally, arresting over 100 people, including the leader of the Movement for Democratic Change, Morgan Tsvangirai. Zimbabwe police claimed that the prayer rally violated a government ban on political protests. In the resulting unrest one opposition activist, Gift Tandare, was shot dead by police.

References

External links 
 Official Website for Save Zimbabwe Campaign
 Movement For Democratic Change
 Wikinews: "Zimbabwe police break up rally, detain leaders"
 Statement by Ephraim Tapa on Save Zimbabwe Campaign
 BBC News: "Mugabe warns on Zimbabwe protests"

Politics of Zimbabwe
Protests in Zimbabwe